La Nation Arabe was an influential Pan-Islamic and Pan-Arabist Arab newspaper which was published in Geneva in the period 1930–1938.

History
La Nation Arabe was first published in Geneva by Shakib Arslan and Ihsan al-Jabri in 1930. It intended to raise attention and action against European imperial control of Arab countries, and Zionist projects in the region of Palestine. The paper was published on a monthly basis. 

La Nation Arabe contained a wide range of topics, including politics, literature, economics and social issues. It was widely read in Arab and European capitals despite being banned from French North Africa in the 1930s. It was influential in spreading new thoughts on Arab Nationalism, anti-Western imperialism, and Islamic self-assertiveness.

References

1930 establishments in Switzerland
1938 disestablishments in Switzerland
French-language newspapers published in Switzerland
Monthly newspapers
Newspapers published in Geneva
Newspapers established in 1930
Pan-Islamism
Pan-Arabist media
Publications disestablished in 1938
Defunct newspapers published in Switzerland